Millwood may refer to:

Places
Australia
Millwood, New South Wales
Millwood, Queensland, a locality in the Toowoomba Region

Canada
 Millwood High School, Lower Sackville, Nova Scotia
 Millwood Junior School, Etobicoke, Ontario
 Mill Woods, Edmonton

South Africa
 Millwood, South Africa

United Kingdom
 Millwood, County Fermanagh, a townland in County Fermanagh, Northern Ireland

United States
 Millwood (Greensboro, Alabama), a historic property near Greensboro, Alabama
 Millwood Lake, in Arkansas
 Millwood, Georgia
 Millwood, Kansas
 Millwood, Kentucky
 Millwood, Massachusetts
 Millwood Township, Stearns County, Minnesota
 Millwood, New York
 Millwood, Ohio, an unincorporated community in Knox County
 Millwood Township, Guernsey County, Ohio
 Millwood Public Schools (Oklahoma), a school district in Oklahoma City
 Millwood, Oregon
 Millwood, Pennsylvania
 Millwood, South Carolina
 Millwood (Richland County, South Carolina) NRHP ruins of plantation house
 Millwood, Texas
 Millwood, Virginia
 Millwood, Washington
 Millwood, West Virginia

People 
 Millwood (surname)